Mesambria, or Mesembria (Μεσημβρία), was an ancient Greek city located in ancient Thrace, on the coast of the Aegean Sea. 

According to Herodotus, it was a bastion that had been founded by Samothrace, was a neighbor of the city of Stryme and in the middle of the two ran the Lissus River. The army of Xerxes passed Mesambria during the expedition against Greece in 480 BCE.

See also
Greek colonies in Thrace

References

External links

Populated places in ancient Thrace
Former populated places in Greece
Greek colonies in Thrace
Ancient Samothrace